North Square in the North End of Boston, Massachusetts, USA, sits at the intersection of Moon, Prince, North, Garden Court and Sun Court Streets. Paul Revere lived here, as did other notables in the 17th and 18th centuries. Prior to July 4, 1788, the area was known as Clark's Square.

History
In the 17th century, Old North Meeting House anchored the neighborhood. Its pastor, Increase Mather, lived in the square "until the great fire of 1677, when his residence was destroyed".

"In the eighteenth century Boston's two grandest houses were on North Square. ... William Clark, merchant, had a 3-story brick house with 26 lavish rooms, and nearby, facing the garden court, was John Foster's house, later occupied by Governor Hutchinson." John Pitcairn and John Downes also lived in the square.

As was typical of the North End generally, in the 20th century predominantly Italian immigrants lived in the square. Since the 1950s, it has been part of the Freedom Trail.

Image gallery

See also
 Mariners House
 Pierce-Hichborn House
 Paul Revere House

References

External links

 Bostonian Society  has materials related to the square.
 Google news archive

Squares in Boston
History of Boston
North End, Boston